Gastrotheca weinlandii is a species of frog in the family Hemiphractidae.
It is found in Colombia, Ecuador, and Peru.
Its natural habitat is subtropical or tropical moist montane forests.
It is threatened by habitat loss.

References

Gastrotheca
Taxonomy articles created by Polbot
Amphibians described in 1892